Bolshoye Fomino is a rural locality (a village) in Krasnopolyanskoye Rural Settlement, Nikolsky District, Vologda Oblast, Russia. The population was 33 as of 2002.

Geography 
Bolshoye Fomino is located 9 km northeast of Nikolsk (the district's administrative centre) by road. Maloye Fomino is the nearest rural locality.

References 

Rural localities in Nikolsky District, Vologda Oblast